Timothy Christopher Adams (born August 4, 1967) is an American actor and model. He is best known for his portrayal of Brucie Kibbutz in the video game Grand Theft Auto IV. He has also been in various television roles such  Casey Mitchum in Sunset Beach as well as multiple film roles as bit parts such as Bad Boys II and Die Hard with a Vengeance.

Early life
Adams was born in Bellville, New Jersey and grew up in Harrison, New Jersey, the middle child of five. He was a student at Queen of Peace High School in North Arlington, New Jersey and Harrison High School in Harrison. He received a BA in Computer Science in New Jersey City University and was a partner in a trucking company before he started his career in show business. He received recognition as an actor when he signed with a modeling agency.

Career
Adams gained his first credited role in the film Die Hard with a Vengeance.  He later started his soap opera career with his role on the short-lived NBC drama Sunset Beach as Casey Mitchum from 1997 to 1999.  After a few appearances on television shows and films, he returned to soap operas playing Rob Layne on Guiding Light, a role he played in 2000.  Adams made his major film debut in the 2003 summer blockbuster Bad Boys II, where he worked alongside Will Smith and Martin Lawrence.

He has been a fitness model since being discovered by renowned modeling photographer John Yannella during his Sunset Beach days, having been seen on the cover of Men's Health several times as well as being the featured model on the cover and within Jeff Csatari's book Your Best Body at 40+, by Rodale, Inc. in Emmaus, Pennsylvania (also publishers of the magazine).

He played Ron Walsh, on a recurring basis, on the ABC soap opera One Life to Live, a role he has played on-and-off since 2003.  He also guest starred on Rescue Me in the third season, playing opposite Mike Lombardi.  In April 2008 he appeared as a gossip reporter on 30 Rock.  In 2010, Adams appeared for eight episodes in the role of Dr. Clayton on All My Children.

He is the voice actor of Brucie Kibbutz in Grand Theft Auto IV. He also reprised his role as Brucie in Grand Theft Auto: The Ballad of Gay Tony and Grand Theft Auto Online.

Personal life
Adams was married to model and TV personality Daisy Fuentes from 1991 to 1995. They were high school sweethearts. He dated Sherri Saum from 1997 to 2003.

Filmography

References

External links

1967 births
Male models from New Jersey
Male actors from New Jersey
New Jersey City University alumni
American male soap opera actors
American male video game actors
American male voice actors
Living people
People from Belleville, New Jersey
People from Harrison, New Jersey